is the wife of former Prime Minister Yoshihide Suga.

She is the sister of one of her husband's co-workers.

References 

Living people
Liberal Democratic Party (Japan) politicians
Spouses of prime ministers of Japan
People from Shimizu, Shizuoka
1953 births